Krylov (masculine) and Krylova (feminine) is a Russian surname, derived from the word "крыло́" (wing). Alternative spellings are Krilov, Kryloff, Kriloff (masculine) and Krilova (feminine).

People
 Alexei Krylov (1863–1945), Russian naval engineer and applied mathematician
 Alexander Krylov (born 1969), Soviet academician and scientist in the field of oil deposits development
Anna Krylov (born 1967), Soviet-born American theoretical chemist
 Andrey Krylov (disambiguation), multiple people, including:
Andrey Krylov (swimmer born 1956), Soviet swimmer
Andrey Krylov (swimmer born 1984), Russian swimmer
Andrey Krylov (gymnast) (born 1988), Russian trampolinist
 Andrei Krylov, Russian guitarist and composer
 Anjelika Krylova (born 1973), Russian ice dancer
 Ivan Krylov (1769–1844), Russian poet and fabulist
 Konstantin Krylov (1967–2020), Russian writer and journalist
 Leonid Krylov (born 1980), Russian canoeist
 Nikita Krylov (born 1992), Ukrainian mixed martial artist
 Nikolay Krylov (disambiguation), multiple people, including:
Nikolay Ivanovich Krylov (1903–1972), Soviet marshal
Nikolay Mitrofanovich Krylov (1879–1955), Russian mathematician
Nikolay Sergeyevich Krylov (1918–1947), Russian physicist
 Nikolay Vladimirovich Krylov, (born 1941), Russian mathematician
 Pavel Aleksandrovich Krylov (born 1986), Russian footballer
 Sergei Krylov (disambiguation), multiple people, including:
Sergei Alexandrovich Krylov (born 1970), Russian violinist
Sergei Borisovitch Krylov, Soviet diplomat and ICJ judge
Sergei Nikolayevich Krylov (born 1963), Russian auto racing driver
Sergei Lvovich Krylov, Russian singer
 Vasily Krylov, Russian biologist
 Victor Krylov, British physicist
 Viktor Krylov (1838–1906), Russian playwright
 Vladimir Krylov, Soviet runner

See also
 Krylovsky